Pendekar Bujang Lapok (The Three Bachelor Warriors) is a 1959 Singaporean comedy film directed by P. Ramlee. It is the second in the Bujang Lapok series of films, and stars the trio of P. Ramlee, S. Shamsuddin and Aziz Sattar, all of which was filmed on site at Jalan Ampas, Singapore.

Although the three main characters have the same names, actors and personalities as the previous Bujang Lapok film, it is not a direct sequel as there are no canonical references to the events in its predecessor.

In October 2014, The Straits Times ranked Pendekar Bujang Lapok as one of the top five Malay films made in Singapore, noting that it won the Best Comedy award at the 6th Asian Film Festival in 1959.

Plot

Ramli, Ajis and Sudin are a trio of bujang lapok (worn-out bachelors or overdue bachelors) waiting at a jetty for a boat to arrive and lead them across the river. The boat company is owned by a rich man named Ahmad Nisfu, who employs thugs to run the business and keep the passengers "in line". The thugs only allow certain people to take the boats early, while others have to wait a long time. An old man called Pendekar (meaning "master" or "warrior") Mustar wants to cross the river, but he is ill-treated by the thugs. When he continues to insist to be allowed to cross the river, he is dragged away to be beaten up, but he defeats all the thugs thereby scaring the rest into letting him ride the boat he wants. After bearing witness to the damage done by the pendekar, the trio decide to follow him and become his students. They proceed to create chaos at the jetty so that the thugs may get distracted and they then use the boats to sail their way to Kampung Pinang Sebatang.

While on their way to finding the master, they chance upon a young lady whom they all start following. Whilst she tried to brush them off, they are undeterred and finally spooked, she then runs off. They run after her, all the way to her house, which incidentally happens to be the house of the pendekar. Whilst initially wary of them, the master softens upon their introduction and admiration of the defeat of the jetty thugs at his hands. He invites them into the house and sets about making them feel at home.

This does not sit well with the woman they chased, who is revealed to be his daughter, Rosmah. She is furious that her father has invited complete strangers into the house, again. The three men overhear her telling her father her frustrations and decide they have to make it up to her. Whilst initially unsuccessful, they finally win her over with a song. She is consoled and proceeds to write them a letter which she slips under the door to their room. It is then discovered that all three bachelors are illiterate and they had to ask the housekeeper, Aini, to read to them the contents of the letter. They then argue about who gets to meet Rosmah at her appointed time. When an agreement was not reached, they then all decide that none of them would meet her. Nevertheless, when midnight approaches, each tries to sneak out of the room but none are successful as they are discovered by the other two.

The next day after inadvertently making the master think it is raining, he calls the trio inside and decide it is an opportune time to begin their silat lessons. Before they can begin training, they must memorise and recite a mantra invoking the elemental spirits. They all fail in their recitation and upon discovery of their illiteracy, the pendekar orders them to attend school to learn how to read and write. Reluctantly, Ramli, Ajis and Sudin proceed to the school the next day where they meet their teacher, who just happens to be Rosmah. Initially embarrassed, they have no choice but to continue with their lessons. As they have only just begun, they are far behind the other students. They fumble the first few times and are loudly laughed at by the other students.

After a few lessons, the trio learn to read and write and manage to recite the mantra correctly. At this point they are ready to begin their training in the martial arts. All three intentionally get their trousers torn, hoping for an opportunity to flirt with Ros while she sews back their clothes. Eventually, Ahmad Nisfu enters the yard with his thugs, demanding compensation for the damage caused by the pendekar and his students. Hearing the commotion, Rosmah appears and tells her father not to concede. Seeing the girl, Ahmad Nisfu says all will be forgiven if the pendekar allows him to marry his daughter. After Rosmah refuses, Ahmad Nisfu vows revenge and departs with his men.

The next day, the master instructs the trio to meditate by reciting the mantra at secluded locations. Ajis is ordered to find a disused well, Sudin has to find an abandoned house and Ramli a gravesite. Their focus is tested by coincidences and they then flee their respective scenes, suspecting spirits in the mix. When they all finally arrive at the house, the pendekar then tells them that they must complete it the next evening but this time to do it together. Despite anything that happens, they are told to disregard any sort of distractions as tests to their concentration.

They proceed to do as told the next evening but it is the evening the jetty thugs picked to ambush the pendekar whilst he is on his own. They then abduct his daughter and bring her back to Ahmad Nisfu whilst tying the pendekar, his wife and Aini up. Aini is released by her fiance, Bang Brahim and she then frees the pendekar's wife and the pendekar too. He seeks to find the thugs but chances upon Ramli, Ajis and Sudin instead and begs them to help him find Ros. They remembers his orders from earlier that evening and continue with their recitations as a testament to their commitment. Despite his attempts to tell them that it is a dire situation, they keep on ignoring him and continuing with their recitations. Finally, the master's wife and Aini arrive at the scene and helps him tell the three bachelors that Ros has indeed been abducted.

Ramli, Ajis and Sudin are finally convinced and then rush off to find Ros. Whilst Ramli spends the whole evening fighting off the leader of the thugs, Sudin and Ajis engineer a clever way to beat the other thugs unconscious. When Rosmah is finally freed, she rushes to Ramli's side but are then fussed over by Ajis and Sudin who are quickly brushed off by Ramli. They scoff at his attempts to win Rosmah over. They all walk back to the Pendekar's home where they are all thanked by his wife for bringing their daughter back home. The Pendekar is impressed that they have learned so quickly and bestows the title Pendekar Bujang Lapok on them.

Cast
 P. Ramlee as Ramli
 Aziz Sattar as Ajis
 S. Shamsuddin as Sudin
 Roseyatimah as Rose
 Hj. Mustar bin Ahmad a.k.a. Mustarjo as Pendekar Mustar
 Momo Latif as Pendekar's wife
 Aini Jasmin as Aini
 Ibrahim Pendek as Abang Brahim
 Ahmad Nisfu as Rich man or Towkay Sampan/ River Jetty Boss
 Shariff Dol as Sharif, Ketua Samseng/ Leader of the thugs
 Ali Fiji as Ali (Samseng/thug)
 Kemat Hassan as Kemat (Samseng/thug)
 A. Rahim as Rahim (Samseng/thug)
 Ahmad C as Ahmad (Samseng/thug)
 Omar Suwita as Omar (Samseng/thug)
 M. Rafee as Rafi (Samseng/thug)
 Sarawan Singh

Songs
 Pok Pok Pok, Bujang Lapok (The Bujang Lapok Theme Song)
 Maafkan Kami (Forgive Us)
 Malam Bulan di Pagar Bintang (The Moonlight in the Edge of the Stars)

References

External links
 
 Pendekar Bujang Lapok at FilemKita.com
 

1959 films
Malay-language films
1950s martial arts films
1959 musical comedy films
Malaysian musical comedy films
Malaysian satirical films
Films directed by P. Ramlee
Malaysian black-and-white films
Singaporean black-and-white films
Films scored by P. Ramlee
Films with screenplays by P. Ramlee
Malay Film Productions films
Films shot in Singapore
Films set in Singapore
Bujang Lapok